Chersogenes victimella is a moth of the family Autostichidae and the only species in the genus Chersogenes. It is found on the Canary Islands.

The wingspan is about 12 mm. The forewings are pale cinereous densely sprinkled with fuscous. The hindwings are dark tawny brown.

References

Moths described in 1908
Symmocinae